Kjell Erik Bystedt (born 24 May 1960) is a retired Swedish hammer thrower who has also competed at the 1988 Summer Olympics.

See also 
 Sweden at the 1988 Summer Olympics

References

External links 
 Olympic.org

1960 births
Living people
Swedish male hammer throwers
Olympic athletes of Sweden
Athletes (track and field) at the 1988 Summer Olympics
People from Västmanland